Khersheh (also Romanized as Kharshah; also known as Khorūshīd, and Khorūsīyeh) is a village in Mosharrahat Rural District, in the Central District of Ahvaz County, Khuzestan Province, Iran. At the 2006 census, its population was 24, in 4 families.

References 

Populated places in Ahvaz County